Rahim Fahim Abdullah (born March 22, 1976) is a former American football player from Clemson University. He was a second round draft pick of the Cleveland Browns in 1999, the year of their return to the NFL. His brother is Khalid Abdullah, who played linebacker for the Cincinnati Bengals.

In his CFL rookie season in 2002, Abdullah showed tremendous promise in his Eskimo debut (July 4 vs Ottawa) with a team-leading 5 defensive tackles and one blocked field goal. He recorded 2 defensive tackles and one sack in Week 3 (July 13 vs Toronto) and continued with a fierce tenure with the team.

He has most recently played for the Edmonton Eskimos of the CFL. He has also played for the Calgary Stampeders. He won the 91st Grey Cup in 2003 with Edmonton.

In 2008, Rahim was a member of the Grand Rapids Rampage of the Arena Football League. He was One of Four AFL rookies who started for the Rampage

Abdullah served for a period as the defensive line coach for Dunwoody High School in Atlanta, GA where he currently resides. He founded FS2 Performance in 2010, an athletic training program that supports overall development of aspiring professional athletes.

References

1976 births
Living people
American football linebackers
Calgary Stampeders players
Canadian football linebackers
Clemson Tigers football players
Cleveland Browns players
Edmonton Elks players
Duncan U. Fletcher High School alumni
Players of American football from Jacksonville, Florida
Grand Rapids Rampage players
Players of Canadian football from Florida